is a Japanese novelist and editor from the Hokkaido Prefecture.

Career 
In 2008, his novel Megane-HOLIC Shindoro~mu (眼鏡HOLICしんどろ〜む) won the 2nd Japan Award of Excellence under the pen name Tetsujin Ueisu (上衛栖鐵人), a novel he debuted with and later renamed to Kanojo wa Megane-HOLIC (彼女は眼鏡HOLIC) under the HJ Bunko label.

His series Aesthetica of a Rogue Hero and The Testament of Sister New Devil were both adapted to anime.

Works 

 Kanojo wa Megane-HOLIC (彼女は眼鏡HOLIC) (Illustrated by Tomoseshunsaku, published by HJ Bunko, 3 volumes, 2008 - 2009)
 ギブあっぷ!（『HJ文庫』、イラスト：会田孝信、全3巻）
 Give Up! (ギブあっぷ!) (Illustrated by Takanobu Aida, published by HJ Bunko, 3 volumes, 2009 - 2010)
 Aesthetica of a Rogue Hero (はぐれ勇者の鬼畜美学) (Illustrated by Tamago no Kimi, published by HJ Bunko, 11 volumes, 2010 - 2013)
 The Testament of Sister New Devil (新妹魔王の契約者) (Illustrated by Nekosuke Ōkuma, published by Kadokawa Sneaker Bunko, 13 volumes (+ 2 side stories), 2012 - 2021)
 Yarisugita Majin Senmetsusha no Shichi Daizai Yūgi (やりすぎた魔神殲滅者の七大罪遊戯) (Illustrated by GoHands, published by Kodansha LIGHT NOVEL, 3 volumes, 2018-)

References

External links 
 はい、こちら現場の上栖です! - Blog

Living people
People from Hokkaido
Japanese novelists
Light novelists
Year of birth missing (living people)